The 1959 USA–USSR Track and Field Dual Meet was an international track and field competition between the Soviet Union and the United States. The second in a series of meetings between the nations, it was held on July 18–19 in Philadelphia, United States, and finished with Soviet Union beating the United States 175 to 167. The meet marked an unusual head-to-head for the nations during the Cold War. The men's 10,000 meters drew attention as the American competitor Bob Soth collapsed in the heat mid-race – an event which was filmed and presented in the Soviet documentary Sport, Sport, Sport.

Results

Teams

Men

Women

References

Turrini, Joseph M. "It Was Communism Versus the Free World": The USA-USSR Dual Track Meet Series and the Development of Track and Field in the United States, 1958-1985. Journal of Sport History, Vol. 28, No. 3 (Fall 2001), pp. 427–471. Retrieved 2019-07-16.
The Cold War Track Series 1958-1965. Racing Past. Retrieved 2019-07-16.
Лёгкая атлетика. Справочник / Составитель Р. В. Орлов. — М.: «Физкультура и спорт», 1983. — С. 155—178, 385.
Матчи СССР — США // Лёгкая атлетика. Энциклопедия / Авторы-составители В. Б. Зеличёнок, В. Н. Спичков, В. Л. Штейнбах. — М.: «Человек», 2012. — Т. 1. — С. 623. — .

1959
International track and field competitions hosted by the United States
Sports competitions in Philadelphia
USA USSR Track and field
USA USSR Track and field
USA USSR Track and field
USA USSR Track and field
July 1959 sports events in Europe